Cheviot is a former railway station in Cheviot, Victoria, Australia. The tracks and buildings (except for an old shed) have been removed.

References

External links
Victorian Railway Stations - Cheviot

Railway stations in Australia opened in 1890
Railway stations closed in 1978
Mansfield railway line
Disused railway stations in Victoria (Australia)